Habakkuk Thomas Baldonado (born September 6, 1999) is an American football defensive end for the Pittsburgh Panthers.

Early life
Baldonado was born in Italy and moved to Florida in the United States in 2017. He attended Clearwater Academy International in Clearwater, Florida for one year. During that one season, he had 83 tackles and 30.5 sacks. Baldonado committed to the University of Pittsburgh to play college football.

College career
Baldonado played in one game his freshman year at Pittsburgh in 2018 and took a redshirt. In 2019, he had 30 tackles and four sacks. In 2020, he played in only four games due to injury and recorded three tackles. As a 14-game starter in 2021, Baldonado had 41 tackles and nine sacks.

References

External links
Pittsburgh Panthers bio

1999 births
Living people
Italian players of American football
Players of American football from Florida
American football defensive ends
Pittsburgh Panthers football players